Dzogchen ("Great Perfection" or "Great Completion"), also known as atiyoga (utmost yoga), is a tradition of teachings in Indo-Tibetan Buddhism and Yungdrung Bon aimed at discovering and continuing in the ultimate ground of existence. The primordial ground (gzhi, "basis") is said to have the qualities of purity (i.e. emptiness), spontaneity (lhun grub, associated with luminous clarity) and compassion (thugs rje). The goal of Dzogchen is knowledge of this basis, this knowledge is called rigpa (Skt. vidyā). There are numerous spiritual practices taught in the various Dzogchen systems for awakening rigpa.

History 

Dzogchen developed in the Tibetan Empire period and the Era of Fragmentation (9th-11th centuries) and continues to be practiced today both in Tibet and around the world. It is a central teaching of the Yundrung Bon tradition as well as in the Nyingma school of Tibetan Buddhism. In these traditions, Dzogchen is the highest and most definitive path of the nine vehicles to liberation. Dzogchen is also practiced (to a lesser extent) in other Tibetan Buddhist schools, such as the Kagyu, Sakya and the Gelug schools.

Etymology and concepts
Dzogchen is composed of two terms:
 rdzogs – perfection, completion
 chen – great

According to the 14th Dalai Lama, the term dzogchen may be a rendering of the Sanskrit term mahāsandhi.

The term initially referred to the "highest perfection" of Vajrayana deity yoga. Specifically it refers to the stage after the deity visualisation has been dissolved and one rests in the natural state of the innately luminous and pure mind. According to Sam van Schaik, in the 8th-century tantra Sarvabuddhasamāyoga, the term refers to "a realization of the nature of reality" which arises through the practice of tantric anuyoga practices which produce bliss.
In the 10th and 11th century, when Dzogchen emerged as a separate vehicle to liberation in the Nyingma tradition, the term was used synonymously with the Sanskrit term ati yoga (primordial yoga).

Rigpa (knowledge) and ma rigpa (delusion)

Rigpa (Sanskrit: vidyā, "knowledge") is a central concept in Dzogchen. According to Ācārya Malcolm Smith:

Ma rigpa (avidyā) is the opposite of rigpa or knowledge. Ma rigpa is ignorance, delusion or unawareness, the failure to recognize the nature of the basis. An important theme in Dzogchen texts is explaining how ignorance arises from the basis or Dharmata, which is associated with ye shes or pristine consciousness. Automatically arising unawareness (lhan-skyes ma-rigpa) exists because the basis has a natural cognitive potentiality which gives rise to appearances. This is the ground for samsara and nirvana.

Traditional exegesis 
The Mirror of the Heart of Vajrasattva (Dorje Sempa Nyinggi Melong), a major Dzogchen tantra, explains the term Dzog (Perfection) as follows:

The Mirror of the Heart of Vajrasattva explains that Dzogchen is "great" because:

 It is the pinnacle of all vehicles, views, meditations, behaviors, goals.
 It is "never moving from the natural state."
 It functions "without obstacles in the realm beyond change."
 It manifests "beyond concepts in the realm beyond attachment."
 It manifests "without attachment in the realm beyond desire"
 It manifests "in great bliss in the realm beyond speech."
 It is "the source that pervades pure enlightenment."
 It is "non-substantial rigpa beyond action and effort."
 It remains "in equality without moving from the realm of total bliss" and "without moving from the essential meaning."
 It exists "everywhere without being a dimension of grasping."
 It is "the essence of everything without being established with words and syllables."

Three series
The Three Series of Dzogchen (rdzogs chen sde gsum) are a traditional Tibetan Buddhist classification which divides the teachings of the Nyingma school's Dzogchen tradition into three series, divisions or sections. These three are: the Semde ('Mind Series'), the Longdé ('Space Series') and the Menngagde ('Instruction Series'). Traditional accounts of the Nyingma school attribute this schema to the Indian master Mañjuśrīmitra (c. 8th century).

According to modern Tibetologists, this doxographic schema actually developed in the literature of the Instruction Series (c. 11th century onwards) as a way to distinguish and categorize the various Dzogchen teachings at the time. According to Instruction Series texts, the Mind Series is based on understanding that one's own mind is the basis of all appearances and that this basis, called mind itself, is empty and luminous. The Space series meanwhile is focused on emptiness (Skt. śūnyatā, T. stong-pa nyid). Finally, the Instruction Series itself is seen as the most direct kind of realization, without the need to meditate on emptiness or mind. Over time, the Instruction Series came to dominate the Dzogchen tradition and it remains the series that is most widely practiced and taught while the other two series are rarely practiced today (with the exception of a few masters like Namkhai Norbu).

According to Namkhai Norbu, the three series are three modes of presenting and introducing the state of Dzogchen. Norbu states that Mennagde is a more direct form of introduction, Longde is closely associated with symbolic forms of introducing Dzogchen and Semde is more focused on oral forms of introduction. Germano writes that the Mind Series serves as a classification for the earlier texts and forms of Dzogchen "prior to the development of the Seminal Heart movements" which focused on meditations based on tantric understandings of bodhicitta (byang chub kyi sems). This referred to the ultimate nature of the mind, which is empty (stong pa), luminous ('od gsal ba), and pure. According to Germano, the Space and Instruction Series are associated with later (historical) developments of Dzogchen "which increasingly experimented with re-incorporating tantric contemplative techniques centered on the body and vision, as well as the consequent philosophical shifts  his became interwoven with."

Base, Path, and Fruit

The Base or Ground 

A key concept in Dzogchen is the 'base', 'ground' or 'primordial state' (Tibetan: gzhi, Sanskrit: āśraya), also called the general ground (spyi gzhi) or the original ground (gdod ma'i gzhi). The basis is the original state "before realization produced buddhas and nonrealization produced sentient beings". It is atemporal and unchanging and yet it is "noetically potent", giving rise to mind (sems, Skt. citta), consciousness (shes pa, Skt. vijñāna), delusion (marigpa, Skt. avidyā) and knowledge (rigpa, Skt. vidyā). Furthermore, Hatchell notes that the Dzogchen tradition portrays ultimate reality as something which is "beyond the concepts of one and many."

Three qualities

According to the Dzogchen-teachings, the Ground or Buddha-nature has three qualities:
 ngo bo, "essence", oneness or emptiness, 
 rang bzhin, "nature", luminosity, lucidity or clarity (as in the luminous mind of the Five Pure Lights),
 thugs rje, "power", universal compassionate energy, unobstructed.

Herbert V. Guenther points out that this Ground is both a static potential and a dynamic unfolding. They give a process-orientated translation, to avoid any essentialist associations, since

The 19th/20th-century Tibetan Buddhist scholar, Shechen Gyaltsap Gyurme Pema Namgyal, sees the Buddha-nature as ultimate truth, nirvana, which is constituted of profundity, primordial peace and radiance:

Direct introduction 

Direct introduction is called the "Empowerment of Awareness" (pronounced "rigpay sall wahng"), a technical term employed within the Dzogchen lineages for a particular lineage of empowerment propagated by Jigme Lingpa. This empowerment consists of the direct introduction of the student to the intrinsic nature of their own mind-essence, rigpa, by their empowering master.

Pointing-out instruction 

In Dzogchen tradition, pointing-out instruction is also referred to as "pointing out the nature of mind", "pointing out transmission", or "introduction to the nature of mind". The pointing-out instruction (ngo sprod) is an introduction to the nature of mind.

The Path
There are three major divisions of the Dzogchen path, known as the "Three Dharmas of the Path." These are tawa, gompa, and chöpa. Namkhai Norbu translates these three terms as 'view,' 'practice,' and 'conduct.'

Garab Dorje's three statements

Garab Dorje (c. 665) epitomized the Dzogchen teaching in three principles, known as "Striking the Vital Point in Three Statements" (Tsik Sum Né Dek), said to be his last words. They give in short the development a student has to undergo:

Garab Dorje's three statements were integrated into the Nyingthig traditions, the most popular of which in the Longchen Nyingthig by Jigme Lingpa (1730–1798). The statements are:

 Introducing directly the face of rigpa itself (ngo rang tok tu tré). Dudjom Rinpoche states this refers to: "Introducing directly the face of the naked mind as the rigpa itself, the innate primordial wisdom."
 Deciding upon one thing and one thing only (tak chik tok tu ché). Dujdom states: "Because all phenomena, whatever manifests, whether saṃsāra or nirvāṇa, are none other than the rigpa’s own play, there is complete and direct decision that there is nothing other than the abiding of the continual flow of rigpa."
 Confidence directly in the liberation of rising thoughts (deng drol tok tu cha). Dujdom comments: "In the recognition of namtok [arising thoughts], whatever arises, whether gross or subtle, there is direct confidence in the simultaneity of the arising and dissolution in the expanse of dharmakāya, which is the unity of rigpa and śūnyatā."

View

Nyingma Dzogchen texts use unique terminology to describe the Dzogchen view (Tib. tawa). Some of these terms deal with the different elements and features of the mind and are drawn from classic Buddhist thought. The generic term for consciousness is shes pa (Skt. vijñāna), and includes the six sense consciousnesses. Worldly, impure and dualistic forms of consciousness are generally referred to with terms such as sems (citta, mind),  yid (mānas) and blo (buddhi). On the other hand, nirvanic or liberated forms of consciousness are described with terms such as ye shes (jñāna, 'pristine consciousness') and shes rab (prajñā, wisdom).  According to Sam van Schaik, two significant terms used in Dzogchen literature is the ground (gzhi) and gnosis (rig pa), which represent the "ontological and gnoseological aspects of the nirvanic state" respectively.

Nyingma Dzogchen literature also describes nirvana as the "expanse" or "space" (klong or dbyings) or the "expanse of Dharma" (chos dbyings, Sanskrit: Dharmadhatu). The term Dharmakaya (Dharma body) is also often associated with these terms in Dzogchen, as explained by Tulku Urgyen:

The Dzogchen View of the secret instruction series (man ngag sde) is classically explained through the eleven vajra topics. These can be found in the String of Pearls Tantra (Mu tig phreng ba), the Great Commentary by Vimalamitra as well as in Longchenpa's Treasury of Word and Meaning (Tsik Dön Dzö).

Practice 

Dzogchen practice (gompa) relies on the view outlined above. However, according to Norbu, this is not an intellectual view, but a "direct, non-dual, non-conceptual knowledge" of fundamentally pure absolute nature which has become veiled by dualistic conditioning. In Dzogchen, one achieves this view through one's relationship with a guru or lama who introduces one to our own primordial state and provides instruction on how to practice. This "direct introduction" and transmission from a Dzogchen master is considered absolutely essential.

Dzogchen teachings emphasize naturalness, spontaneity and simplicity. Although Dzogchen is often portrayed as being distinct from or beyond tantra, Dzogchen traditions have incorporated many tantric concepts and practices. Dzogchen lineages embrace a varied array of traditions, that range from a systematic rejection of Buddhist tantra, to a full incorporation of tantric practices. The "main practices" are often considered advanced and thus preliminary practices and ritual initiation are generally seen as requirements.

The Dzogchen tradition contain vast anthologies and systems of practices, including Buddhist meditation, tantric yogas and unique Dzogchen methods. The earliest form of Dzogchen practice (the Semde, "Mind" series) generally emphasized non-symbolic "formless" practices (as opposed to tantric deity yoga). With the influence of Sarma tantra, the rise of the Longchen Nyingtik tradition, and the systematisations of Longchenpa, the main Dzogchen practices came to be preceded by preliminary practices and infused with tantric practices.

Namkhai Norbu makes a distinction between Dzogchen "contemplation" proper (trekchö) and "meditation". According to Norbu, contemplation is "abiding in the non-dual state [i.e. rigpa] which, of its own nature, uninterruptedly self-liberates" while meditation is any practice "working with the dualistic, relative mind, in order to enable one to enter the state of contemplation." Norbu adds that all the various meditative practices found in Dzogchen teachings (such as the "six yogas") are simply means to help practitioners access rigpa and are thus "secondary."

Similarly, Achard notes that the core Dzogchen practice is the state of contemplation (dgongs pa) that refers to abiding in one's primordially pure state. This "could actually be described as an actual absence of particular practice" which is "devoid of action, effort and exertion" (such as tantric generation or completion practice). Furthermore, Achard notes that "for strict rDzogs chen practitioners, Guru-Yoga and Sky Gazing are the main means enabling the access to the state of Contemplation in a totally unaltered mode."

Preliminary practices 

In Finding Ease in Meditation (bsam gtan ngal gso), Longchenpa outlines three main categories of preliminary practices. He stresses that these are necessary to the practice of Dzogchen and criticizes those who attempt to skip them.

The Longchen Nyingthig system divides preliminaries into ordinary and extraordinary types. The ordinary preliminaries are a series of contemplations of which there are two main instructional texts. One is based on Atisha's Seven Point Mind Training (Lojong) and is called the Tarpai Temke. The second is the Laglenla Deblug.

The extraordinary preliminaries are discussed in the Drenpa Nyerzhag.

According to Jigme Lingpa, the preliminary practices are the basis of the main practices, and thus, they are not to be abandoned at a later point. Norbu writes that the preliminaries are not compulsory in Dzogchen practice (only direct introduction is essential), instead, the preliminaries are only relatively useful depending on the capacity of individuals and how many obstacles they have in their practice of contemplation.

Another important requirement for practicing Dzogchen according to Jigme Lingpa is ritual initiation or empowerment (dbang) by an awakened lama. According to Tsoknyi Rinpoche, empowerment is necessary, as it plants the "seeds of realization" within the present body, speech and mind. Empowerment "invests us with the ability to be liberated into the already present ground." The practices bring the seeds to maturation, resulting in the qualities of enlightened body, speech and mind.

Following tantric initiation, one also engages in the tantric practices of the generation and completion stages of mahayoga and anuyoga. Jigme Lingpa sees all of these tantric practices as gradual steps to be cultivated which lead one to Great Perfection practice. Jigme Lingpa states:

Rushen and  sbyong ba

Jigme Lingpa mentions two kinds of Dzogchen meditations (which can be used as preliminaries to trekchö) korde rushen, "making a gap between samsara and nirvana," and sbyong ba ("training").

Rushen are a series of visualisation and recitation exercises. The name reflects the dualism of the distinctions between mind and insight, ālaya and dharmakāya. Longchenpa places this practice in the "enhancement" (bogs dbyung) section of his concluding phase. It describes a practice "involving going to a solitary spot and acting out whatever comes to your mind."

Sbyong ba are a variety of teachings for training the body, speech and mind. The training of the body entails instructions for physical posture. The training of speech mainly entails recitation, especially of the syllable hūm. The training of the mind is a Madhyamaka-like analysis of the concept of the mind, to make clear that mind cannot arise from anywhere, reside anywhere, or go anywhere. They are in effect an establishment of emptiness by means of the intellect. According to Jigme Lingpa, these practices serve to purify the mind and pacify the hindrances.

Main practices 
The actual Dzogchen meditation methods, which are unique to the tradition, appear in Longchen Nyingtik texts such as Jigme Lingpa's Yeshe Lama and Longchenpa's Tsigdön Dzö and Tegchö Dzö. The presentation of Dzogchen meditation methods in the Yeshe Lama is divided into three parts:

 Instructions for those of sharp faculties, which is where the actual Dzogchen meditation methods are found, such as trekchö and tögal.
 Instructions for those of middling faculties, which discusses the bardo (intermediate state) of death and how to practice during this phase
 Instructions for those of lesser faculties, which discusses the transference of consciousness (phowa) at death to a pure land.

Contemplation 

The Dzogchen meditation practices include a series of exercises known as semdzin (sems 'dzin), which literally means "to hold the mind" or "to fix mind." They include a whole range of methods, including fixation, breathing, and different body postures, all aiming to calm the mind and bring one into the state of contemplation. There are also methods of vipasyana (lhagthong) which works with the arising of thoughts. These practices can be found in all three Dzogchen series: Semde, Longdé and Mennagde. Norbu considers these methods of samatha (shine) and vipasyana (lhagthong) to be "principal practices", even though they work with the mind and are not non-dual contemplation itself.

According to Namkhai Norbu, through these various methods one may arrive at "the state of non-dual contemplation" which is without doubts. At this stage, one must continue to remain in this state, which includes the practices of trekchö and tögal.

Trekchö 

Trekchö (khregs chod) means "(spontaneous) cutting of tension" or "cutting through solidity". The practice of trekchö reflects the earliest developments of Dzogchen, with its admonition against practice. In this practice one first identifies, and then sustains recognition of, one's own innately pure, empty awareness. The main trekchö instructions in the Lamrim Yeshe Nyingpo state "This instant freshness, unspoiled by the thoughts of the three times; You directly see in actuality by letting be in naturalness."

Tögal 

Tögal (thod rgal) literally means "crossing the peak." It is sometimes translated as "leapover", "direct crossing", or "direct transcendence". Tögal is also called "the practice of vision", or "the practice of the Clear Light (od-gsal)". Jigme Lingpa follows Longchenpa in seeing the visionary practice of tögal as the highest level of meditation practice.

Phowa (transference of consciousness) 

Those beings of lesser faculties and limited potential will not attain awakening during the bardo but may transfer their consciousness (a practice called phowa) to a pure land once they have arrived at the "bardo of existence". Once they reach this bardo, they will recognize they have died and then they will recall the guru with faith and remember the instructions. Then they will think of the pure land and its qualities and they will be reborn there. In a pure land, beings can listen to the Dharma taught directly by Vajrasattva or some other Buddha. Jigme Lingpa recommends that one practice this in daily life as well.

Bardo yoga 
For those of middle level capacities, Jigme Lingpa holds that they will attain awakening during the bardo or intermediate state during death, by following certain instructions on how to recognize the signs of death and how to practice during the death process. Jigme Lingpa describes the process as follows:

Jigme Lingpa also states one should practice this meditation while one is alive, to prepare for the death process meditation: "even while one is alive, when the sky is pristine, direct awareness into space and think, 'The moment of death has arrived. Now I must pass into the peaceful unelaborate expanse.' Exhale the breath and follow that by allowing the mind to remain without focus." Other meditations and techniques are taught as well, which should be practiced while one is alive.

Jigme Lingpa gives the following instructions, meant to be recited by a lama or fellow practitioner at the time of death. Various practices are also taught for those who are present when someone else is dying, such as the "three precious upadeshas of the great, profound tantra Conjunction of the Sun and Moon". These practices are meant to help the dying through the process and lead them to awakening or a higher rebirth.

Further practices related to the "bardo of the nature of phenomena" are also taught. At this point, one should practice trekchö and tögal. There are also specific instructions for this phase of death, which occurs when "the connection between body and mind has ended." According to Jigme Lingpa, at this stage, the consciousness of the basis of all dissolves into the basic space of phenomena and "in that instant, the natural clear light dawns like a cloudless autumn sky."

If one does not attain awakening, there will be a series of appearances which will be "extremely bright and colorful, devoid of distinctions such as outer, inner, wide, or narrow." There will also be appearances of the mandalas of peaceful and fierce deities. One is supposed to recognize all these appearances as being one's own mind and as lacking true existence.

Jigme Lingpa outlines the key point in bardo practice as follows:

Practice systems

Longchenpa's Natural Ease system 
Longchenpa's Trilogy of Natural Ease (ngal gso skor gsum), is mainly a Semde (Mind Series) focused system, though it includes numerous elements from later more tantric systems. In the first volume of this trilogy, Finding Ease in the Nature of Mind (sems nyid ngal gso), Longchenpa outlines 141 contemplative practices, split into three sections: exoteric Buddhism (92), tantra (22), and the Great Perfection (27). This system remained influential in Tibet and was the main system taught by Patrul Rinpoche (1808-1887).

This system includes numerous contemplative practices including analytical contemplations into emptiness, calming (zhi gnas) practices (such as visualizing the channels, a deity or the breath), insight (lhag mthong) practices as well the integration (zung 'jug) of calming and insight (such as the practice of sky gazing or contemplating the mind). It also includes numerous contemplations which are formless and "technique free" and thus do not make sure of an object of focus (such as a tantric deity) and instead focus on intangible themes such as emptiness, the spaciousness of the mind and the illusory quality of appearances.

In the second book of the Trilogy of Natural Ease, Finding Ease in Meditation (bsam gtan ngal gso), Longchenpa uses the standard triad of meditative experiences (nyams) to present various practices: bliss (bde ba), radiance/clarity (gsal ba), and non-conceptuality (mi rtog pa), which is presented as corresponding to preliminaries, main practice, and concluding phase. The bliss practices are focused on tummo, "radiance" practices use the bodily winds/breath and visualization of light, and the practices dealing with non-conceptuality are based on contemplating the vastness of the sky.

The more conceptual meditations are relegated to the preliminary phase, while the main practices are formless and "direct" approaches supplemented by perfection stage techniques (i.e. anuyoga). Longchenpa includes the perfection phase techniques of channels, winds and nuclei into the main and concluding phases which also include new supporting contemplative techniques. However, unlike in other perfection stage practice systems, Longchenpa's perfection practices are extremely simple (spros med), and stress effortlessness and balance instead of complexity (spros bcas).

Jigme Linpa's Longchen Nyingthig system 

The teachings based on Jigme Lingpa's 18th century Longchen Nyingthig system are also divided into preliminary practices (ngondro, subdivided into various classes) and main practices (which are trekchö and tögal). In The White Lotus (rGyab brten padma dkar po), Jigme Lingpa outlines the path of Nyingthig Dzogchen practice as follows:

 According to Sam van Schaik, Jigme Lingpa's system of practice "represents both a graduated method and a gradual realization" which "stands in stark contrast to the discourse of the Great Perfection treasure texts," which defend a much more simultaneous form of practice.

Conduct

Norbu notes that "Tantric practices may be used as secondary practices by the practitioner of Dzogchen, alongside the principal practice of contemplation." Similarly, physical yoga (Tib. trulkhor) may also be used as supporting practices.

The Fruit

Self-liberation
According to Namkhai Norbu, in Dzogchen, "to become realized simply means to discover and manifest that which from the very beginning has been our own true condition: the Zhi (gzhi) or Base." Since the basis, the path of practice and the fruit or result of practice are non-dual from the ultimate perspective, in Dzogchen understands the path as not separate from the result or fruit of the path (i.e. Buddhahood). Once a Dzogchen practitioner has recognized their true nature (and "do not remain in doubt" regarding this), the path consists of the integration (sewa) of all experiences in their life with the state of rigpa. All these experiences are self-liberated through this integration or mixing.

This process is often explained through three "liberations" or capacities of a Dzogchen practitioner:
Cherdrol ("one observes and it liberates") - This is when an ordinary appearance occurs and one sees its true nature, which leads to its self-liberation. It is compared to how a drop of dew evaporates when the sunlight shines on it.
Shardrol ("as soon as it arises it liberates itself") - This occurs when any sense contact or passion arises self-liberates automatically and effortlessly. This is compared to how snow melts immediately on falling into the sea.
Rangdrol ("of itself it liberates itself"), according to Norbu, this is "completely non-dual and all-at-once, instantaneous self-liberation. Here the illusory separation of subject and object collapses of itself, and one's habitual vision, the limited cage, the trap of ego, opens out into the spacious vision of what is". The simile used here is a snake effortlessly unwinding its own body.

Advanced Dzogchen practitioners are also said to sometimes manifest supranormal knowledge (Skt. abhijñā, Tib. mngon shes), such as clairvoyance and telepathy.

Rainbow body 
Tögal practice may lead to full Buddhahood and the self-liberation of the human body into a rainbow body at the moment of death, when all fixation and grasping has been exhausted. Tibetan Buddhism holds that the rainbow body is a nonmaterial body of light with the ability to exist and abide wherever and whenever as pointed by one's compassion. It is a manifestation of the sambhogakāya and its attainment is said to be accompanied by the appearance of lights and rainbows.

Some exceptional practitioners are held to have realized a higher type of rainbow body without dying (these include the 24 Bön masters from the oral tradition of Zhang Zhung, Tapihritsa, Padmasambhava, and Vimalamitra). Having completed the four visions before death, the individual focuses on the lights that surround the fingers. His or her physical body self-liberates into a nonmaterial body of light with the ability to exist and abide wherever and whenever as pointed by one's compassion.

Critique

Simultaneous and gradual practice 
As noted by van Schaik, there is a tension in the Longchen Nyingtik tradition of Dzogchen between methods which emphasize gradual practice and attainments, and methods which emphasize primordial liberation, simultaneous enlightenment, and non-activity. This seeming contradiction is explained by authors of the tradition as being related to the different levels of ability of different practitioners.

For example, the works of Jigme Lingpa contain criticisms of methods which rely on cause and effect as well as methods that rely on intellectual analysis. Since Buddhahood is uncaused and transcendent of the intellect, these contrived and conceptual meditations are contrasted with "effortless" and "instantaneous" approaches in the works of Jigme Lingpa, who writes that as soon as a thought arises, it is to be seen nakedly, without analysis or examination. Similarly, a common theme of Dzogchen literature is the elevation of Dzogchen above all other "lower" ('og ma) vehicles and a criticism of these lower vehicles which are seen as inferior (dman pa) approaches.

In spite of these critiques, Dzogchen cycles like Jigme Lingpa's Longchen Nyingthig do contain numerous practices which are not instantaneous or effortless, such as tantric Mahayoga practice like deity yoga and preliminary methods such as ngondro (which are equated with the path of accumulation). Furthermore, Jigme Lingpa and Longchenpa also criticize those who teach the simultaneous method to everyone and teach them to dispense with all other methods at once.

In response to the idea that the gradualist teachings found in the Longchen Nyingtik texts contradict the Dzogchen view of primordial liberation, Jigme Lingpa states:

This division of practices according to level of ability is also found in Longchenpa's Tegchö Dzö. However, as van Schaik notes, "the system should not be taken too literally. It is likely that all three types of instruction contained in the threefold structure of YL [Yeshe Lama] would be given to any one person." Therefore, though the instructions would be given to all student types, the actual capacity of the practitioner would determine how they would attain awakening (through Dzogchen meditation, in the bardo of death, or through transference of consciousness). Jigme Lingpa also believed that students of the superior faculties were extremely rare. He held that for most people, a gradual path of training is what is needed to reach realization.

See also

Teachers
Chagdud Tulku Rinpoche
Dilgo Khyentse
Dudjom Rinpoche
Dzogchen Rinpoche
Dzongsar Khyentse Chökyi Lodrö
Jigme Phuntsok

 
Lopön Tenzin Namdak
Namkhai Norbu Rinpoche
Nyoshul Khenpo Rinpoche
Sogyal Rinpoche
Tharchin Rinpoche
Tulku Urgyen

Terms
Ganachakra
Lukhang
Mahamudra
Ngagpa
Trul khor

Notes

Quotes

References

Citations

Works cited

Dzogchen texts

Contemporary Buddhist sources

Western academic sources

  ⟨halshs-01244881⟩
 
 
 
 
 
 
 
 
 
 
 
 
 
 
 
 
 
 
 
 
 
 
 

 
 
 
 
   (hc);  (pbk).

Web sources

Further reading

External links

 
Bon
Nyingma
Tibetan Buddhist philosophical concepts
Tibetan Buddhist practices